Maramarua is a locality in the north-eastern part of the Waikato District of New Zealand. State Highway 2 runs through the settlement.

Demographics
The SA1 area is part of the larger Maramarua statistical area.

Maramarua settlement had a population of 186 at the 2018 New Zealand census, an increase of 27 people (17.0%) since the 2013 census, and an increase of 27 people (17.0%) since the 2006 census. There were 66 households, comprising 96 males and 90 females, giving a sex ratio of 1.07 males per female. The median age was 34.6 years (compared with 37.4 years nationally), with 51 people (27.4%) aged under 15 years, 24 (12.9%) aged 15 to 29, 96 (51.6%) aged 30 to 64, and 15 (8.1%) aged 65 or older.

Ethnicities were 83.9% European/Pākehā, 29.0% Māori, 3.2% Pacific peoples, 1.6% Asian, and 1.6% other ethnicities. People may identify with more than one ethnicity.

Although some people chose not to answer the census's question about religious affiliation, 64.5% had no religion, 25.8% were Christian, and 1.6% had Māori religious beliefs.

Of those at least 15 years old, 9 (6.7%) people had a bachelor's or higher degree, and 45 (33.3%) people had no formal qualifications. The median income was $38,400, compared with $31,800 nationally. 33 people (24.4%) earned over $70,000 compared to 17.2% nationally. The employment status of those at least 15 was that 75 (55.6%) people were employed full-time, 24 (17.8%) were part-time, and 3 (2.2%) were unemployed.

Maramarua statistical area

Maramarua statistical area had a population of 1,767 at the 2018 New Zealand census, an increase of 288 people (19.5%) since the 2013 census, and an increase of 354 people (25.1%) since the 2006 census. There were 582 households, comprising 906 males and 861 females, giving a sex ratio of 1.05 males per female. The median age was 36.6 years (compared with 37.4 years nationally), with 438 people (24.8%) aged under 15 years, 285 (16.1%) aged 15 to 29, 840 (47.5%) aged 30 to 64, and 204 (11.5%) aged 65 or older.

Ethnicities were 74.5% European/Pākehā, 28.7% Māori, 5.9% Pacific peoples, 5.1% Asian, and 2.2% other ethnicities. People may identify with more than one ethnicity.

The percentage of people born overseas was 13.9, compared with 27.1% nationally.

Although some people chose not to answer the census's question about religious affiliation, 58.4% had no religion, 30.4% were Christian, 1.2% had Māori religious beliefs, 0.3% were Hindu, 1.0% were Muslim, 0.2% were Buddhist and 1.2% had other religions.

Of those at least 15 years old, 153 (11.5%) people had a bachelor's or higher degree, and 324 (24.4%) people had no formal qualifications. The median income was $32,400, compared with $31,800 nationally. 213 people (16.0%) earned over $70,000 compared to 17.2% nationally. The employment status of those at least 15 was that 696 (52.4%) people were employed full-time, 213 (16.0%) were part-time, and 78 (5.9%) were unemployed.

History
In 1913 a launch linked with Mercer via the Maramarua River.

The Kōpako sub-bituminous open cast coal mine was sold by Solid Energy to Bathurst Resources and Talleys in 2016. The 1948 mine restarted production in 2017. It was once linked to Meremere Power Station by an aerial ropeway.

Two prominent New Zealanders have died while driving near Maramarua.

Stephen Allen, a lawyer and local body politician, died of a heart attack in 1964 and in the resulting crash, his housekeeper was also killed. Historian Michael King and his wife died when their car crashed into a tree in 2004.

Publican Chris Bush was shot dead at the Red Fox Tavern in Maramarua on 24 October 1987, shortly before midnight, while he was having a drink with staff. Nearly thirty years later, in 2017, two men were charged with murder and aggravated robbery. Mark Joseph Hoggart and another accomplice, with name suppression, have been found guilty of the murder of Chris Bush, on 29 March 2021. Both men have been sentenced to life imprisonment for the murder of Chris Bush, on 7 May 2021.

Education

References

Populated places in Waikato
Waikato District